Benzoyl-CoA:anthranilate N-benzoyltransferase may refer to:
 N-benzoyl-4-hydroxyanthranilate 4-O-methyltransferase
 Anthranilate N-benzoyltransferase